Kadi Pärnits (born 26 June 1965 in Pärnu) is an Estonian politician, lawyer and trade union leader. Sse has been member of X Riigikogu.

She was a member of party Moderate People's Party.

References

1965 births
Living people
Estonian women lawyers
Social Democratic Party (Estonia) politicians
Members of the Riigikogu, 2003–2007
Women members of the Riigikogu
University of Tartu alumni
People from Pärnu
20th-century Estonian lawyers
21st-century Estonian lawyers
21st-century Estonian women politicians